Cathayanthe is a genus of flowering plants belonging to the family Gesneriaceae.

Its native range is Hainan.

Species:
 Cathayanthe biflora Chun

References

Didymocarpoideae
Gesneriaceae genera